The 1951 Bulgarian Cup Final was the 11th final of the Bulgarian Cup (in this period the tournament was named Cup of the Soviet Army), and was contested between CSKA Sofia and Akademik Sofia on 7 November 1951 at People's Army Stadium in Sofia. CSKA won the final 1–0 after extra time.

Route to the Final

Match

Details

See also
1951 A Group

References

Bulgarian Cup finals
PFC CSKA Sofia matches
Cup Final